The Organization of Internationalist Communists of Greece (Greek: Οργάνωση Κομμουνιστών Διεθνιστών Ελλάδας, Organosi Kommouniston Diethniston Elladas) is a Greek Trotskyist political party. It is also known by its acronym ΟΚΔΕ (OKDE).

History 
The historical roots of OKDE can be traced to the Left Opposition of the Communist Party of Greece around Pandelis Pouliopoulos and Pastias Giatsopoulos, which was expelled at the third Regular Congress of the party in 1928. Originally, the expelled did not consider themselves to be a different movement to the Communist Party, nor did they seek to found a new political group; rather, their main goal was to return to the Party in order to, in their view, restore its original Leninist principles. This changed, however, in 1934, when all the communist parties in Nazi Germany were outlawed with the rise of National Socialism. Pouliopoulos and Giatsopoulos considered that the Communist Party of Greece had now abandoned its original position that the Stalinist communist parties and the Third International could apply revolutionary Marxism in Greece. Thus, the Spartacus League, along with syndicalist groups which left the Archeio-Marxist movement and others were united and formed OKDE.

In 1985, some members left the party and formed the Organization of Communist Internationalists of Greece–Spartacus. The party supported the Radical Left Front at the 2007 legislative elections. In the 2010 local elections, the party elected one municipal councillor at the Ampelokipoi-Menemeni municipality. In 2012, the party participated at the May legislative elections, where it received the 0.03% of the vote.

External links

1934 establishments in Greece
Communist parties in Greece
Political parties established in 1934
Trotskyist organizations in Greece